Xerophilaspidina is a subtribe of armored scale insects.

Genera
Costalimaspis
Credodiaspis
Cryptaspidus
Cryptodiaspis
Fissuraspis
Hovaspis
Neoparlaspis
Nicholiella
Pelliculaspis
Trigonaspis
Vinculaspis
Xerophilaspis

References

Diaspidini